Dietrich James "D. J." Richardson (born February 11, 1991) is an American professional basketball player who last played for Aix Maurienne Savoie Basket of the LNB Pro B. He attended Peoria Central for his first three years of high school and transferred to Findlay Prep in Henderson, Nevada for his senior year.  He played collegiately at the University of Illinois.

High school
As a junior at Peoria Central Richardson was selected to first-team All-State by the Champaign-Urbana News-Gazette and second-team All-State by the AP and Chicago Sun-Times. In his senior year at Findlay College Prep, Richardson, along with Texas recruit Avery Bradley, led the Findlay College Prep Pilots to a high school national championship after beating Oak Hill 74-66 and finishing their season 33-0.

College career
Richardson joined fellow 2009 recruits, including Brandon Paul, on the University of Illinois 2009–10 men's basketball team coached by Bruce Weber. Andy Katz of ESPN called Richardson and Paul "the best freshman backcourt not at Kentucky John Wall and Eric Bledsoe". Richardson was named Big Ten Freshman of the Year by the coaches and was unanimously selected to the Big Ten All-Freshman team. Richardson finished his career ranked 13th on Illini all-time scoring list (1,477 points, third in made 3-pointers (278), and tied for third in games played (138). After his senior season, Richardson was selected to participate in the Portsmouth Invitational Tournament.

College statistics

|-
| style="text-align:left;"| 2009–10
| style="text-align:left;"| Illinois
| 36 || 35 || 30.9 || .399 || .390 || .775 || 2.7 || 2.1 || 0.7 || 0.2 || 10.5
|-
| style="text-align:left;"| 2010–11
| style="text-align:left;"| Illinois
| 34 || 30 || 26.8 || .415 || .385 || .758 || 1.8 || 1.9 || 0.7 || 0.2 || 8.4
|-
| style="text-align:left;"| 2011–12
| style="text-align:left;"| Illinois
| 32 || 31 || 34.7 || .387 || .348 || .774 || 3.0 || 1.7 || 0.8 ||0.2 || 11.6
|-
| style="text-align:left;"| 2012–13
| style="text-align:left;"| Illinois
| 36 || 36 || 33.8 || .363 || .322 || .815 || 3.9 || 1.6 || 1.3 || 0.2 || 14.5
|-
| style="text-align:center;" colspan="2"| Career
| 138 || 132 || 31.5 || .388 || .355 || .787 || 2.8 || 1.8 || 0.9 || 0.2 || 13.6
|-

Professional career
After going undrafted in the 2013 NBA Draft, Richardson worked out for the Utah Jazz in mid-September 2013. On October 24, 2013, Richardson signed to play professionally in Austria for the UBC Güssing Knights. In January 2014 Richardson signed to play for Toros de Aragua of the Venezuelan Professional Basketball League, however he suffered an ankle injury that forced the team to cut him before playing a game.

On July 31, 2014 Richardson signed with Korikobrat which competes as a member of the Korisliiga in Finland. After that season, he signed with Kouvot from the same Korisliiga for the 2015–16 season. He eventually won the Finnish championship with Kouvot.

On February 26, 2018, Richardson joined Aries Trikala of the Greek Basket League.

References

External links
Profile at FIBA.com
Profile at Eurobasket.com
Profile at FightingIllini.com

Living people
1991 births
Aix Maurienne Savoie Basket players
American expatriate basketball people in Austria
American expatriate basketball people in Belgium
American expatriate basketball people in Finland
American expatriate basketball people in France
American expatriate basketball people in Germany
American expatriate basketball people in Greece
American expatriate basketball people in Poland
American men's basketball players
Aries Trikala B.C. players
Basketball players from Illinois
Findlay Prep alumni
Illinois Fighting Illini men's basketball players
Kobrat players
Kouvot players
Parade High School All-Americans (boys' basketball)
s.Oliver Würzburg players
Stal Ostrów Wielkopolski players
Shooting guards
Spirou Charleroi players
Sportspeople from Peoria, Illinois